In magnetic resonance, a spin echo or Hahn echo is the refocusing of spin magnetisation by a pulse of resonant electromagnetic radiation. Modern nuclear magnetic resonance (NMR) and magnetic resonance imaging (MRI) make use of this effect.

The NMR signal observed following an initial excitation pulse decays with time due to both spin relaxation and any inhomogeneous effects which cause spins in the sample to precess at different rates.  The first of these, relaxation, leads to an irreversible loss of magnetisation. But the inhomogeneous dephasing can be removed by applying a 180° inversion pulse that inverts the magnetisation vectors.  Examples of inhomogeneous effects include a magnetic field gradient and a distribution of chemical shifts. If the inversion pulse is applied after a period t of dephasing, the inhomogeneous evolution will rephase to form an echo at time 2t.  In simple cases, the intensity of the echo relative to the initial signal is given by e–2t/T2 where T2 is the time constant for spin–spin relaxation. The echo time (TE) is the time between the excitation pulse and the peak of the signal.

Echo phenomena are important features of coherent spectroscopy which have been used in fields other than magnetic resonance including laser spectroscopy and neutron scattering.

History 
Echoes were first detected in nuclear magnetic resonance by Erwin Hahn in 1950, and spin echoes are sometimes referred to as Hahn echoes. In nuclear magnetic resonance and magnetic resonance imaging, radiofrequency radiation is most commonly used.

In 1972 F. Mezei introduced spin-echo neutron scattering, a technique that can be used to study magnons and phonons in single crystals. The technique is now applied in research facilities using triple axis spectrometers.

In 2020 two teams demonstrated  that when strongly coupling an ensemble of spins to a resonator, the Hahn pulse sequence does not just lead to a single echo, but rather to a whole train of periodic echoes. In this process the first Hahn echo acts back on the spins as a refocusing pulse, leading to self-stimulated secondary echoes.

Principle
The spin-echo effect was discovered by Erwin Hahn when he applied two successive 90° pulses separated by short time period, but detected a signal, the echo, when no pulse was applied.   This phenomenon of spin echo was explained by Erwin Hahn in his 1950 paper, and further developed by Carr and Purcell who pointed out the advantages of using a 180° refocusing pulse for the second pulse. The pulse sequence may be better understood by breaking it down into the following steps:

Several simplifications are used in this sequence: no decoherence is included and each spin experiences perfect pulses during which the environment provides no spreading. Six spins are shown above and these are not given the chance to dephase significantly. The spin-echo technique is more useful when the spins have dephased more significantly such as in the animation below:

Spin-echo decay
A Hahn-echo decay experiment can be used to measure the spin–spin relaxation time, as shown in the animation below. The size of the echo is recorded for different spacings of the two pulses. This reveals the decoherence which is not refocused by the π pulse. In simple cases, an exponential decay is measured which is described by the T2 time.

Stimulated echo
Hahn's 1950 paper showed that another method for generating spin echoes is to apply three successive 90° pulses. After the first 90° pulse, the magnetization vector spreads out as described above, forming what can be thought of as a "pancake" in the x-y plane. The spreading continues for a time , and then a second 90° pulse is applied such that the "pancake" is now in the x-z plane. After a further time  a third pulse is applied and a stimulated echo is observed after waiting a time  after the last pulse.

Photon echo
Hahn echos have also been observed at optical frequencies. For this, resonant light is applied to a material with an inhomogeneously broadened absorption resonance. Instead of using two spin states in a magnetic field, photon echoes use two energy levels that are present in the material even in zero magnetic field.

Fast spin echo
Fast spin echo (FAISE or FSE, ref 65bis), also called turbo spin echo (TSE) is an MRI sequence that results in fast scan times. In this sequence, several 180 refocusing radio-frequency pulses are delivered during each echo time (TR) interval, and the phase-encoding gradient is briefly switched on between echoes.
The FSE/TSE pulse sequence superficially resembles a conventional spin-echo (CSE) sequence in that it uses a series of 180º-refocusing pulses after a single 90º-pulse to generate a train of echoes. The FSE/TSE technique, however, changes the phase-encoding gradient for each of these echoes (a conventional multi-echo sequence collects all echoes in a train with the same phase encoding).  As a result of changing the phase-encoding gradient between echoes, multiple lines of k-space (i.e., phase-encoding steps) can be acquired within a given repetition time (TR). Because of multiple phase-encoding lines are acquired during each TR interval, FSE/TSE techniques may significantly reduce imaging time.

65-bis - Ph. MELKI, R.V. MULKERN, L.P. PANYCH, F.A. JOLESZ. 
Comparing Spin Echo Sequences with the FAISE Method. 
J. Magn. Reson. Imag. 1991; 1:319-326. 

65-Ter Ph. MELKI, F.A. JOLESZ, R.V. MULKERN. 
Partial RF echo planar with the FAISE method: Experimental and theoritical assessment of image artifacts. 
Mag. Res. Med. 1992; 26:328-341.

65-Quatro - Ph. MELKI, F.A. JOLESZ, R.V. MULKERN. 
Partial RF echo planar imaging with the FAISE method: Contrast equivalence with spin echo sequences. 
Mag. Res. Med. 1992; 26:342-354.

See also
 Nuclear magnetic resonance
 Magnetic resonance imaging
 Neutron spin echo
 Electron paramagnetic resonance
 Photon echoes in semiconductor optics

References

Further reading

External links
Animations and simulations
 Spin Echo Simulation scratch.mit.edu
 The animation show pulse sequences like spin-echo sequence

Magnetic resonance imaging
Nuclear magnetic resonance
Quantum mechanics
Scientific techniques
Electron paramagnetic resonance